"Hannah Montana" is a song by American hip hop group Migos, released on November 26, 2013, as the second single from their mixtape Y.R.N. (Young Rich Niggas) (2013). The song was produced by Southern hip hop producer Dun Deal. The song references American pop singer Miley Cyrus' Disney Channel character Hannah Montana, using the titular character of her show as a euphemism for cocaine and MDMA.

Remix
The song was later remixed and dubbed the "Twerk Remix". This is the first song the group recorded with their fellow member Offset following his release from jail in October 2013.

Music video 
The official music video, directed by Gabriel Hart, was released on December 9, 2013.

Chart performance

Release history

References 

2013 singles
2013 songs
Migos songs
Music videos directed by Gabriel Hart
Songs about drugs
Hannah Montana
Songs written by Quavo
Songs written by Takeoff (rapper)